A Kylie Christmas is the fifth extended play by Australian recording artist Kylie Minogue. It was released digitally on 30 November 2010 by Parlophone. Minogue's cover of the 1953 song "Santa Baby" first appeared as a B-side to her 2000 single "Please Stay". Minogue uploaded a music video of "Let It Snow" to her official YouTube channel on 10 December 2010.

Another EP called A Christmas Gift was released with songs from Minogue's eleventh studio album Aphrodite.

Track listing

Charts

Release history

References

External links
 Kylie Minogue's official website

2010 Christmas albums
2010 EPs
Christmas albums by Australian artists
Pop Christmas albums
Kylie Minogue EPs
Christmas EPs